The 1990 United States Senate election in Texas was held on November 6, 1990. Incumbent Republican U.S. Senator Phil Gramm won re-election to a second term.

Major candidates

Democratic 
 Hugh Parmer, State Senator and former Mayor of Fort Worth

Republican 
 Phil Gramm, incumbent U.S. Senator

Campaign 
Gramm, a popular incumbent who switched parties a few years prior, had over $5 million on hand.

Results

See also 
 1990 United States Senate elections

References 

Texas
1990
1990 Texas elections